Alban George Henry Gibbs, 2nd Baron Aldenham (23 April 1846 – 9 May 1936), was a British Conservative Party politician and peer, the son of Henry Hucks Gibbs, 1st Baron Aldenham.

He was elected at the 1892 general election as a Member of Parliament (MP) for the City of London, and held the seat until his resignation from the House of Commons on 14 February 1906 by the procedural device of accepting appointment as Steward of the Manor of Northstead.

He succeeded to the title Baron Aldenham on 13 September 1907.

He married Bridget Beresford-Hope, daughter of Alexander Beresford-Hope, on 18 February 1873. They had three children:
Catherine Louisa Gibbs (1875–1967)
Mildred Dorothea  Gibbs (1876–1961)
Gerald Henry Beresford Gibbs, 3rd Baron Aldenham (1879–1939)

References

External links 
 

Aldenham, Alban Gibbs, 2nd Baron of
Aldenham, Alban Gibbs, 2nd Baron of
Conservative Party (UK) MPs for English constituencies
UK MPs 1892–1895
UK MPs 1895–1900
UK MPs 1900–1906
UK MPs 1906–1910
UK MPs who inherited peerages
Fellows of the Society of Antiquaries of London
Members of Parliament of the United Kingdom for the City of London
Alban
Alban